Gersik Saguking is one of the villages in the Federal Territory of Labuan. It is located near the city of Labuan.

Demographics 
Ethnic groups in the village include Malay,  Brunei, Kedayan, Chinese and some minorities of Indian, Kadazan and other indigenous people.

Facilities 
Many of the accommodations in the village are government quarters. Examples include Sekolah Pekan Quarters #1  and  Jabatan Kerja Raya (Public Works Department) quarters. An-Nur Mosque is the biggest mosque in the Federal Territory of Labuan; Islam is the main religion of the island. The infrastructure in this village is good; all the roads have been layered with bitumen and streets are made of cement. All citizens have been supplied with adequate electricity and water facilities.

Educational facilities located inside the village include:

- Sekolah Menengah Kebangsaan Labuan 
- Sekolah Kebangsaan Pekan 1
- Sekolah Kebangsaan Pekan 2
- Sekolah Kebangsaan Chi Wen
- Sekolah Rendah Agama Pekan

Labuan